Three Piece Elongated Figure No. 1 is a sculpture by Henry Moore. It was unveiled in 1962 in the atrium of the CIBC Tower by mayor Jean Drapeau, the artist's first monumental sculpture to be unveiled in Canada. It was then known as Three Piece Reclining Figure, No. 1. Seven editions of the work were cast. The CIBC donated it to its present home in the Musée des beaux-arts de Montréal in 2017 and it is now exhibited in its sculpture garden.

References

1960s sculptures
Bronze sculptures
Monuments and memorials in Montreal
Sculptures of the Montreal Museum of Fine Arts